Taungoo is in the Bago region of Burma.

Headquarters

Paku Karen Baptist Association 
Bwe Karen Baptist Association 
Keh Ko Keh Ba Karen Baptist Association 
Seventh-day Adventist, Central Myanmar Mission 
Toungoo Diocese, Anglican Communion 
Diocese of Taungoo, Roman Catholic

Churches

Paku Town Baptist Church, (English, Burmese, Karen)
Trinity Baptist Church (Karen)
Keh Ko Keh Ba Baptist Church (Karen)
Taungoo Myanmar Baptist Church (Burmese)
Sacred Heart Roman Catholic Cathedral
St. Paul Church (Karen, Burmese)
St. Luke Church
St. John The Baptist Church (English, Burmese, Karen)
Min Gyi Nyo Baptist Church
AG Del Su Church
AG Min Gyi Nyo Church
New Paku Town Baptist Church
Kyaut Twin Karen Baptist Church
Hsaw Hti Thaw Karen Baptist Church
Mu Draw Thaw Karen Baptist Church
Kaw Thay Del Karen Baptist Church
Seventh-day Adventist Church

 Taungoo
Taungoo
Bago Region
Churches in Taungoo